Henry White (1531/1532–1570) was an English politician.

He was a Member (MP) of the Parliament of England for Reigate in April 1554 and for Downton in 1555.

References

1532 births
1570 deaths
English MPs 1554
English MPs 1555